The 2012–13 season was the 81st season in Málaga CF's history and their 32nd season in La Liga, the top division of Spanish football.  It covers a period from 1 July 2012 to 30 June 2013.

During the season, Málaga competed in the UEFA Champions League for the first time in their history.

Players

Squad information
The numbers are established according to the official website:www.malagacf.es and www.lfp.esAs of 2 June 2013''

Transfers

In

Total expenditure:  €800,000

Out

Total income:  €45,700,000

Club

Coaching staff

Competitions

La Liga

League table

Results summary

Results by round

Matches

Copa del Rey

Round of 32

Round of 16

Quarter-finals

UEFA Champions League

Play-off round

Group stage

Knockout phase

Round of 16

Quarter-finals

Statistics

Goals

Last updated: 2 June 2013
Source: Match reports in Competitive matches

Pre-season and friendlies

See also
 2012–13 Copa del Rey
 2012–13 La Liga

References

External links
  

Malaga
Málaga CF seasons
Malaga